Felicia Weathers (born 13 August 1937) is an American soprano in opera and concert.

Weathers was born in St. Louis, Missouri. She entered Washington University in St. Louis with a medical career in mind, but after one year she transferred to Lincoln University (Missouri) to study music. In 1957, she placed second in the Metropolitan Opera National Council Auditions. Weathers attended Indiana University School of Music, where she studied voice with Dorothee Manski, Charles Kullman, and Frank St. Leger. She sang in Zurich, Vienna, Munich, Berlin, Hamburg, Paris, Oslo, Copenhagen, Stockholm, The Royal Opera in London, La Scala in Milan and Metropolitan Opera, New York.

One of her supporters was the conductor Herbert von Karajan. Among Weathers' notable opera performances were the leading roles in Salome (R. Strauss), Aida (Verdi), Madama Butterfly (Puccini), and as Dona Anna in Don Giovanni (Mozart), Elisabeth in Don Carlos (Verdi), and many others. She is also a recitalist and concert singer.

Weathers is recipient of many international awards. For instance for her outstanding achievements in Italy, she was awarded with the Il Sagittario d'oro. From the hands of the Norwegian King Harald she received a national award for her dedicated work for Norway. She received an honorary doctorate in music from Indiana University in 1972. February 13 of every year has been made Felicia Weathers Day by the city of Indianapolis, Indiana. In Germany, she received the Deutscher Schallplattenpreis. In 2011, she was recipient of the National Opera Association's "Lift Every Voice" award.

Her last performance in opera was in 1999 in Germany. Here she sang the role of Chrysothemis in Elektra (R. Strauss). Since then she sings in concerts and dedicates her professional experience in being a voice and vocal technique teacher.

Weathers directed Madama Butterfly for the Ebony National Opera in New York City and for the Heidelberg Oper in Germany. She directed Il trovatore in Philadelphia and Porgy and Bess in Rio de Janeiro.

References

External links
"Felicia Weathers (Soprano)", profile and pictures at bach-cantatas.com

Profile, Opera Arts

1937 births
Living people
Musicians from St. Louis
20th-century African-American women singers
20th-century American women opera singers
African-American women opera singers
American operatic sopranos
Winners of the Metropolitan Opera National Council Auditions
Voice teachers
American opera directors
Female opera directors
Singers from Missouri
Classical musicians from Missouri
Women music educators
21st-century American women
Washington University in St. Louis alumni
Lincoln University (Missouri) alumni
Jacobs School of Music alumni